Sir Donald Bradman Drive (and its western section as Burbridge Road) is a major arterial road that travels east–west through the western suburbs of Adelaide, South Australia. It is the main route from the Adelaide city centre to the Adelaide Airport.

Route
Commencing at the intersection with Seaview Road, Burbridge Road heads directly east through West Beach, before intersecting with Tapleys Hill Road, changing name to Sir Donald Bradman Drive and continuing east along the northern border of Adelaide Airport. Crossing Marion Road, it continues east through Cowandilla and Hilton, crosses South Road, and continues across the Adelaide Parklands Terminal railyards, through the Adelaide Park Lands, to terminate with Grote Street at the intersection with West Terrace in Adelaide's city centre.

History
Formerly known as Burbridge Road, the section between the city centre and Tapleys Hill Road was renamed as Sir Donald Bradman Drive on 1 January 2001 in honour of Australian cricketer Sir Donald Bradman. The remaining section of Burbridge Road, west of Tapleys Hill Road to the coast, retains its original name.

Major intersections

See also

References

Roads in Adelaide
Don Bradman